Irina Anatolyevna Beglyakova (February 26, 1933 – March 19, 2018) was a Soviet athlete who competed mainly in the discus throw. She trained at Burevestnik in Moscow.

She competed for the USSR in the 1956 Summer Olympics held in Melbourne, Australia in the Discus where she won the Silver medal.

References

External links
 Sports Reference

1933 births
2018 deaths
Russian female discus throwers
Soviet female discus throwers
Olympic athletes of the Soviet Union
Athletes (track and field) at the 1956 Summer Olympics
Olympic silver medalists for the Soviet Union
Burevestnik (sports society) athletes
European Athletics Championships medalists
Medalists at the 1956 Summer Olympics
Olympic silver medalists in athletics (track and field)